Relations between Burkina Faso and the United States are good but subject to strains in the past because of the Compaoré government's past involvement in arms trading and other sanctions-breaking activity.

According to the 2012 U.S. Global Leadership Report, 82% of Burkina Faso people approve of U.S. leadership, with 17% disapproving and 1% uncertain, the third-highest rating of the U.S. for any surveyed country in Africa.

Overview

In addition to regional peace and stability, U.S. interests in Burkina are to promote continued democratization and greater respect for human rights and to encourage sustainable economic development. Although the Agency for International Development (USAID) closed its office in Ouagadougou in 1995,  in late May 2013 it sent a representative to re-open an Office under its Mission in Senegal.   Under a combination of regional and bilateral aid programs, USAID provides approximately $50 million annually to Burkina's development through non-governmental and regional organizations. The largest is a Food for Peace school lunch program administered by Catholic Relief Services. Burkina has been the site of several development success stories. U.S. leadership in building food security in the Sahel after the 1968-74 drought has been successful in virtually eliminating famine, despite recurrent drought years. River blindness has been eliminated from the region. In both cases, the U.S. was the main donor to inter-African organizations headquartered in Ouagadougou which through sustained efforts have achieved and consolidated these gains. In 2005, Burkina Faso and the Millennium Challenge Corporation (MCC) signed a $12 million Threshold Country Program to build schools and increase girls' enrollment rates. In November 2005, the Millennium Challenge Corporation selected Burkina Faso as eligible to submit a proposal for Millennium Challenge Account assistance for fiscal year 2006, making it one of only two countries eligible for threshold as well as compact funding. The Government of Burkina Faso is working closely with MCC staff to finalize its compact submission.

The Peace Corps entered Burkina Faso in 1966. The Peace Corps program was phased out in 1987, but was invited to return to Burkina Faso in 1995 as part of a newly established health project. One year later, the Peace Corps established a secondary education project and in 2003, Peace Corps introduced a small enterprise development project to complement the government's poverty reduction and private sector promotional programs. In 2005, the Government of Burkina Faso asked for assistance to increase the level of girls' access to education, which later became the focus of the Millennium Challenge Corporation's Threshold Compact with Burkina Faso. All Peace Corps Volunteers, regardless of sector, are trained in how to promote awareness on HIV/AIDS and Gender and Development.

U.S. trade with Burkina Faso is still extremely limited — $220 million in U.S. exports and $600,000 in Burkinabé exports to the U.S. in 2004 — but investment possibilities exist, especially in the mining and communications sectors.

Principal U.S. Officials
 Ambassador — Sandra E. Clark
 Deputy Chief of Mission — Steven Koutsis
 USAID Representative — James C. Parys

Diplomatic missions 
The U.S. Embassy in Burkina Faso is located in Ouagadougou.

See also 
 Foreign relations of Burkina Faso
 Foreign relations of the United States
 List of ambassadors of Burkina Faso to the United States

References

External links
 History of Burkina Faso - U.S. relations

 
United States
Bilateral relations of the United States